Port Covington is a neighborhood in Baltimore, Maryland. Previously, Port Covington was a railroad terminal  built by the Western Maryland Railway in 1904 on the Middle Branch of the Patapsco River. The terminal facilities included coal, grain and merchandise piers, overhead cranes, 11 rail yards, warehouses, a roundhouse, a turntable and a machine shop. In the 1920s rotary dumpers for coal and coke were installed, as well as a large grain elevator. Port operations ended in the 1970s and the site was abandoned in 1988.

The site has since been redeveloped for commercial use, and it currently includes a former Walmart store that opened in 2002 and closed in January 2016. Interstate 95 serves Port Covington through Exits 54 (Hanover Street) and 55 (Key Highway); through this area, McComas Street serves as a frontage road between the two exits and continues east into the Locust Point neighborhood.

Proposed development
In January 2016, plans were unveiled by Sagamore Development Company, owned by Under Armour CEO Kevin Plank, regarding the redevelopment of Port Covington in South Baltimore. The new plan for Port Covington calls for two proposed new light rail stations, along with new residential and commercial development. The first station would be located west of Hanover Street, and the other would be located at the intersection of East McComas Street and East Cromwell Street, just south of Federal Hill. This proposed extension would create a new spur from the Central Light Rail line by crossing the Middle Branch of the Patapsco River south of Interstate 95. Additional features of the proposed redevelopment include a new entertainment venue, new waterfront park areas, makerspace, as well as new offices for Under Armour and other industries owned by Kevin Plank.

Sagamore Development has requested $1.1 billion in federal, state and municipal government financing, including $535 million in tax increment financing (TIF) from the City of Baltimore. The proposed TIF is the largest ever proposed in Baltimore, and would be one of the largest TIFs in the country. MuniCap, a financial consulting firm, projected that the Port Covington properties owned by Sagamore would be worth $2,608,900,706 at full build-out.

Some local residents are concerned with the adverse environmental impact the project will have on an already unstable region.

Other Baltimoreans are concerned that the economic impact of the development will only benefit a segment of the population, leaving behind the city's poorer, economically depressed communities. At an August 2016 city council work session to discuss the potential project, tempers brewed. A local clergy member and community organizer said, "The city really should not be in the business of subsidizing affluent enclaves, especially one year after the unrest." An attorney for Sagamore Development reportedly bristled, and later offered that the project, which would include "world class" kayak facilities, would be available to the black community as well: "I'm fairly sure that African-Americans kayak too." Another pastor and community activist shouted in response, "This is for rich white people! You want it, you pay for it yourself!"

Community groups have called for public financing to be linked to guarantees for a public profit-sharing agreement and financing for schools to cover potential loss of $315 million in funding over 40 years for Baltimore schools. Advocates have also called for more affordable housing as part of the development, and lowering the size of the proposed TIF to cover only required infrastructure development, not additional amenities such as kayak landings.

Construction officially began on the first phase of the development on May 13, 2019. The project is now overseen by Weller Development, headed by Marc Weller, a partner in Sagamore Development. In 2017, the New York investment bank Goldman Sachs invested $233 million and became a partner in the Port Covington project.

References

External links

Historic American Engineering Record in Baltimore
Ports and harbors of Maryland
Transportation in Baltimore
Western Maryland Railway
South Baltimore